Hannah Jayne Blundell (born 25 May 1994) is an English professional footballer who plays as a defender for Manchester United in the Women's Super League and the England national team.

Club

Youth career
Blundell grew up in Eastbourne and began playing football for local youth team Polegate Grasshoppers, the team her two brothers already played for, at the age of seven. Two years later she was scouted to join the Brighton & Hove Albion Centre of Excellence. In 2005 she moved to Chelsea for a season, playing for the club's under-12 team. However, the Chelsea coaches raised concerns over Blundell's small size when she trialled to remain at the academy. She eventually had a successful trial at Charlton Athletic and remained in the team's academy for four years up to under-16 level.

In 2010, the chance presented itself for Blundell to return to Chelsea. She enrolled in a local college, living in the college's accommodation and playing for their football team while also training in the Chelsea academy during the week and travelling home at the weekend to play with Eastbourne Ladies with whom she won the Sussex County FA Women's Challenge Trophy in 2012. At 17, Blundell trialled for the Chelsea reserve team and was accepted, eventually studying for a third year in order to remain in the accommodation to stay with Chelsea.

Chelsea
During her third year back in the Chelsea youth system, Emma Hayes took over as first team manager and began to integrate Blundell into first team training, helping the club get Blundell and teammate Drew Spence a flat next to the training ground. She made her debut on 28 May 2013 as a 70th-minute substitute for Ólína Guðbjörg Viðarsdóttir and scored three minutes later during a 2–1 defeat to Birmingham. She made eight league appearances including six starts for the Blues in 2013, predominantly playing at left-back despite being naturally right-sided, filling in for Claire Rafferty during her lengthy injury lay-off.

After a strong 2014 season, starting in 12 of Chelsea's 14 WSL games, Blundell was nominated for the PFA Women's Young Player of the Year award, losing out to Leah Williamson. She was again nominated for the same award a year later as Chelsea did the double, winning their first WSL title and FA Cup with Blundell playing the entire final, the first to be held at Wembley Stadium. This time she lost out to Beth Mead. Blundell was, however, named as the club's Young Player of the Year, shared with Millie Bright. In January 2017, she signed a new two-year contract. Blundell remained Chelsea's first-choice right-back for the following two seasons.

During the 2019–20 season opener, Blundell suffered a quad injury which kept her sidelined for 11 weeks with Maren Mjelde laying claim to the starting role in her absence. In February 2020, Blundell signed a new two-and-a-half year contract until June 2022. However, by the following season, Blundell had also fallen behind out-of-position winger Niamh Charles in the depth chart, starting just 6 of Chelsea's 39 games with Charles and veteran Jessica Carter starting as full-backs ahead of Blundell in the 4–0 2021 UEFA Women's Champions League Final defeat to Barcelona.

Manchester United
On 23 July 2021, Manchester United announced the signing of Blundell on a two-year-deal with the option of a further year. The move was part of the transfer that saw Lauren James join Chelsea.

International

Youth
Blundell was part of the England U19 squad that finished as runners-up to France at the 2013 UEFA Women's Under-19 Championship, making one start and a further four substitute appearances. The result qualified England for the 2014 FIFA U-20 Women's World Cup. Blundell started all three games as England finished third in the group and were eliminated.

Senior
In October 2015, Blundell was called-up to the senior England team by Mark Sampson for the 2015 Yongchuan International Tournament but was an unused substitute in both games. She was an unused substitute in January 2017 in a friendly against Sweden, and again for friendlies against Italy and Austria as Sampson prepared for UEFA Women's Euro 2017. Blundell was not named to the final tournament squad.

Blundell eventually made her senior international debut under Phil Neville during the final match of the 2018 SheBelieves Cup on 8 March 2018, as an 87-minute substitute for Demi Stokes in a 1–0 defeat to the United States. She started in her second appearance and registered an assist on a Rachel Daly goal as part of a 6–0 2019 FIFA Women's World Cup qualifying win against Kazakhstan. After winning her third cap against Austria in November 2018, Blundell was named to England squads twice in 2019: for a friendly against New Zealand in June, and for a double header of friendlies against Belgium and Norway in August but did not feature in any of the games.

Personal life
As of 2022, she was dating professional footballer Tom Pett.

Career statistics

Club
.

International
Statistics accurate as of match played 8 November 2018.

Honours

Club
Chelsea
FA Women's Super League: 2015, 2017–18, 2019–20, 2020–21
Women's FA Cup: 2014–15, 2017–18
FA Women's League Cup: 2019–20, 2020–21
FA WSL Spring Series
Community Shield: 2020
UEFA Women's Champions League runner-up: 2020–21

International
UEFA Women's Under-19 Championship runner-up: 2013
SheBelieves Cup runner-up: 2018

Individual
PFA WSL Team of the Year: 2017–18, 2018–19

References

External links
 
 
 

1994 births
Living people
Sportspeople from Eastbourne
English women's footballers
Women's association football fullbacks
Chelsea F.C. Women players
Manchester United W.F.C. players
Women's Super League players
England women's under-23 international footballers
England women's international footballers
Association footballers' wives and girlfriends